"We Three (My Echo, My Shadow and Me)" is a ballad published in 1939 by Nelson Cogane ( Nelson Cogane Fonarow; 1902–1985), Sammy Mysels and Dick Robertson. It was a hit song in 1940 for both The Ink Spots on Decca and Frank Sinatra with the Tommy Dorsey Orchestra on RCA Victor, both versions reaching No. 3 in Billboard in December.

Cover versions
 The Ink Spots version was recorded in July 1940 and released on Decca in October (b/w "My Greatest Mistake").
 Dolores O'Neill recorded "We Three" with the Bob Chester Orchestra on 14 August 1940 in New York City
 Ella Fitzgerald, who would later record with The Ink Spots, also recorded the song for Decca in 1940; it is included on the 2003 CD compilation Jukebox Ella: The Complete Verve Singles, Vol. 1.
 Brenda Lee recorded "We Three" for her 1960 Decca album This Is...Brenda.
 Bob Dylan has performed the song in concert three times, twice in 1986 and once in 1988.
 Country singer Wayne Hancock covered "We Three" on his 2001 album A-Town Blues.
 Paul McCartney included the song on his 2012 album of American standards, Kisses On The Bottom with Canadian pianist and singer Diana Krall.

Use in pop culture 
The Ink Spots version of the song was featured in the opening scene of "Smoke", the first episode of season 4 of Better Call Saul, depicting "Gene" living in Omaha, Nebraska after the events of Breaking Bad.

The Ink Spots version of the song has been used for three video games: the 2010 BioShock 2, the 2018 Fallout 76 on the in-game Appalachia Radio, and the 2019 Man of Medan.

The Ink Spots version of the song was featured in episode 6 of Watchmen.

The Ink Spots version of the song was used in episode 1, season 2 of The Blacklist.

References

1940 songs
Songs written by Dick Robertson (songwriter)
Frank Sinatra songs
The Ink Spots songs